Katherine Mary Lyon (aged 10) and Sheila Mary Lyon (aged 12) were sisters who disappeared without a trace during a March 25, 1975 trip to a shopping mall in the Washington, D.C. suburb of Wheaton, Maryland. Known colloquially as The Lyon Sisters, their case resulted in one of the largest police investigations in Washington metropolitan area history.

In 2013, a team of cold case investigators with the Montgomery County, Maryland, police made a break in the case. They focused on Lloyd Lee Welch, Jr., then serving a lengthy prison sentence in Delaware for child sexual abuse, the culmination of a long criminal record that had begun a few years after the girls' disappearance with a burglary arrest in their jurisdiction. In September 2017, Welch pleaded guilty to two counts of first-degree murder for the abduction and murder of the two sisters. It had long been "one of the most high-profile unsolved cases in the D.C. area." The girls' remains have never been found.

Police records show that during the original investigation, Welch came forward a week after the girls' disappearance and falsely told a security guard at the shopping center visited by the girls immediately before they disappeared that he had witnessed another man abduct them there. The description Welch provided of the other man matched a description that newspapers and other media already had provided the public. According to that description, a conservatively dressed man had demonstrated a new type of audiocassette player at the shopping mall as children and teens, including the Lyon sisters, gathered near him. A short time after Welch told this story to the mall security guard trying to cast suspicion on the other man, he was questioned at a police station, failed a lie detector test, admitted he had lied, was released and was not questioned again until more than 38 years later.

During the reopening of the case, police discovered that a mug shot taken of Welch in 1977 bore a strong resemblance to a police sketch of a possible suspect who had been seen staring inappropriately at the Lyon sisters in the shopping mall. Detectives began interviewing Welch in prison; he made statements that further implicated him although he continued to protest his innocence. One of his relatives told them he had helped Welch burn two heavy, bloodied duffel bags in Bedford County, Virginia. In July 2015, Welch was indicted and charged with the girls' murders there; he pleaded guilty to murder two years later. His uncle is a person of interest as well.

Background to the sisters' disappearance
The two sisters were born to John and Mary Lyon in Kensington, Maryland. They had an older brother, Jay, who later became a policeman. Their father, John Lyon, was a well-known radio personality at WMAL, a local radio station then held by the owner of the ABC Television affiliate in Washington and the now-defunct Washington Star; he later worked as a victims' counselor. The sisters' disappearance continued to be featured in high-profile stories in the national media for months.

Located a half-mile away from their home was Wheaton Plaza shopping mall (now Westfield Wheaton). On March 25, 1975, Katherine and Sheila Lyon walked to the mall to see the Easter exhibits. It was their spring vacation and they planned to have lunch at the Orange Bowl, a pizza restaurant which was part of the mall. They left home between 11:00 AM and noon. Their mother had instructed them to return home by 4:00 PM; when they had not arrived by 7:00 PM, the police were called and an extensive search was conducted. Police felt comfortable enough with the accuracy of this timeline to release it to the public:

11:00 AM to Noon: The girls leave home.
1:00 PM: A neighborhood child sees both of the girls together outside the Orange Bowl speaking to an unidentified man, according to what he later tells investigators. 
2:00 PM: The girls' older brother sees them at the Orange Bowl eating pizza together.
2:30 to 3:00 PM: A friend sees the girls walking westward down a street near the mall which would have been one of the most direct routes from the mall to their home. This is the final sighting of the sisters that is absolutely confirmed by the police.
4:00 PM: This curfew set by their mother passes. The girls are expected home and do not arrive.
7:00 PM: Police are called. The investigation and an active search by professionals begins.

Police investigation
Police were told by witnesses that the sisters were in the Wheaton Plaza mall at approximately 1 PM. A neighborhood boy, who knew the sisters, reported that he saw them together outside the Orange Bowl speaking with an unidentified man, about 6 feet tall, 50 to 60 years old, and wearing a brown suit. The man was carrying a briefcase with a tape recorder inside; there were also other children around who were speaking into a microphone he was holding. The witness' description of the man led authorities to view the unknown person as a prime suspect in the Lyon sisters' case and two composite sketches of the man were created.

Police investigating the case followed up on reports from several people who said they recognized the sketch of the unknown man with the briefcase. Press reports indicated that a man matching the sketch was seen a few weeks earlier at the Marlow Heights Shopping Center and Iverson Mall, both in neighboring Prince George's County, Maryland. These people reported that he had approached several young girls and asked them to read an answering machine message typed on an index card into his hand-held microphone. The police never publicly acknowledged a direct link between these reports and the Lyon sisters' disappearance.

After the disappearance, a friend of the Lyon sisters, a girl who was in their age bracket, described to detectives how a long-haired man at the mall had stared at the girls so long and so intently that she confronted him. A sketch artist made a drawing based on her description: white, late teens or early 20s, acne on his face, scars on his left cheek, shabbily dressed. That sketch, though, appears not to have been widely disseminated. The description from the sisters' friend contrasted sharply with the only description of a possible suspect that was made public in 1975, that of the well-groomed, conservatively dressed person eventually labeled "tape recorder man." Aside from the major differences in facial features, hair and clothing, the long-haired man and "tape recorder man" were several decades apart in age.

As weeks passed, numerous volunteer groups combed vacant lots and stream beds for the sisters. The search continued and media attention reached such a fever pitch that on May 23, 1975, Maryland Lt. Gov. Blair Lee ordered 122 National Guardsmen to participate in a search of a Montgomery County forest for the missing girls.

No trace of the girls was found.

False leads
On April 7, 1975, about two weeks after their disappearance, a witness in Manassas, Virginia, reported seeing two girls resembling Sheila and Katherine in the rear of a beige 1968 Ford station wagon. The witness stated that the girls were bound and gagged in the vehicle. The driver of the station wagon resembled the man in the publicly available sketch of the prime suspect. The witness further claimed that when the driver spotted the witness tailing him, he ran a red light and sped west on Route 234 towards Interstate 66 in Virginia. The station wagon had Maryland license plates with the possible combination "DMT-6**." The last two numbers are unknown due to the bending of the car's plate. The known combination was issued in Cumberland, Hagerstown, and Baltimore, Maryland at the time. This supposed sighting inspired a small army of mobile citizen band (CB) radio users to scour the area throughout the evening and into the night with a running commentary and chatter but without any tangible results. A search for matching plate numbers failed to produce any information. Although this witness's report was at first treated as credible, and a media firestorm erupted because of it, it was later deemed "questionable" by police.

The disappearance generated calls from psychics, extortionists and attention seekers. Several phone calls from people claiming to have the girls and offering to exchange them for ransom money were made to the Lyon family in the immediate aftermath of the sisters' disappearance. One began with an anonymous male voice on April 4, 1975, and demanded that John Lyon leave a briefcase with $10,000 inside an Annapolis, Maryland, courthouse restroom. He left just $101 in the briefcase as directed by law enforcement officials, just enough to make the crime a felony, but the briefcase was never claimed. This same anonymous person called John Lyon later and said that there were too many police around the courthouse and he could not retrieve the ransom. John Lyon said he would have to hear the girls' voices before he would do anything else. He never contacted them again.
Lloyd Welch reported seeing the girls and a man to a mall guard one week after the disappearance.  The police took down his elaborate statement.  However, when given a lie detector test, he failed on most of his answers, and he and his report were disregarded.

Suspects
Authorities learned that he interviewed for a job (and was subsequently employed) in Silver Spring, Maryland, six days after the Lyon sisters vanished. Silver Spring is a short distance from Wheaton Plaza. Investigators have been unable to determine if Coffey is connected to the case, and he was never charged in the disappearances.

Raymond Rudolph Mileski Sr. was another possible suspect named in press reports. Mileski resided in Suitland, Maryland, in 1975, not far from the malls in Prince George's County that had reported a man with a microphone approaching young girls. In a family disagreement, Mileski murdered his wife and teenage son and wounded another son inside their home in November 1977. He was convicted of the homicides and sentenced to 40 years in prison. Based on both prison informants' tips and Mileski's own claims to know something about the Lyon sisters case, which he offered to share more fully in exchange for more favorable prison conditions, authorities searched his former residence in April 1982, but no evidence was discovered. Mileski died in prison in 2004.

John Brennan Crutchley had also been considered a suspect.

Lloyd Welch
As mentioned above, Lloyd Welch provided his own version of events a week after the disappearance. On the same day that newspapers printed a description of the conservatively dressed man carrying a briefcase with audiocassette recorder and holding a microphone, Lloyd Welch returned to Wheaton Plaza mall and told a security guard he had evidence for the case. He said he had seen a man with a tape recorder talking to two girls and later, forcing the girls into a car, according to court records. Montgomery County investigators were summoned to the mall and took Welch to a nearby police station to interview him. They gave him a polygraph test. When informed that he had failed it, he admitted he had provided false information about witnessing the abduction and was released by police, according to documents in the case. A one page report was typed up and placed on top of the transcript of the interview, with the word "lied" written on top. For more than 38 years thereafter, information about Welch's possible involvement in the case was accessible only via a search of police records.

Over the years, many detectives worked on the Lyon girls' cold case. However, many had retired by 2013. Sergeant Chris Homrock, after years of reviewing every detail of the case, ran across Lloyd Welch's statement. He had not read it previously. Critically, he also noticed that the mug shot of Welch roughly matched the police sketch created some 38 years ago.

From the details in the file Homrock thought that at minimum Welch had witnessed the crime, because he had described the limp of Ray Mileski, and Homrock still had not ruled out Mileski. However, Homrock had also learned that Welch had since been convicted of child molestation. Detectives began working from this new angle, and after doing background work, planned an interview strategy. On October 16, 2013, they had their first interview with Welch. They had feared that Welch would not speak with them; however, on the first day of that interview, Welch spoke with them for many hours. Throughout this long interrogation process Welch inadvertently revealed the truths of the crime hidden in his elaborate frameworks of lies to Detective Dan Davis.

Welch's cousin, Henry Parker, told detectives in December 2014 that in 1975 he met Welch at a property on Taylor's Mountain Road, in Thaxton, Virginia. Parker said he helped remove two army-style duffel bags from Welch's vehicle. Each bag "weighed about 60 or 70 pounds and smelled like 'death,'" according to a search warrant affidavit, which was filed and sealed in January 2015. Moreover, Parker said the bags had been covered in red stains. Without knowing their contents, Parker threw the bags into a fire.

In February 2014, Welch was openly named as a person of interest in the case. Police said Welch, who was 18 years old in 1975, and has since been convicted of rapes in three other states, had been "seen 'paying attention' to the sisters."

A new lead was discovered as of September 20, 2014. The police searched the woods of Thaxton, Virginia, and entered a house in Hyattsville, Maryland, seizing several items. The home was that of Welch's parents, and he had lived in the basement. Although the evidence was too degraded to trace any DNA, one room of the basement had significant evidence of blood; one of the detectives used the word "slaughtered" to describe the scene.

Over a year later, in July 2015, Welch, then serving a lengthy sentence in Delaware on a child-molestation conviction, was indicted on first-degree felony murder for his alleged involvement in the deaths of Katherine and Sheila Lyon. He was also charged with abduction with intent to defile. The location of any remains of the girls' bodies is still unknown. Had Welch been brought to trial without the girls' bodies entered into evidence, it would have been the longest time to have elapsed between a murder and a trial in a bodiless murder conviction.

Ultimately, in September 2017, Welch pleaded guilty to two counts of first-degree murder for the abduction and killing of Katherine and Shelia Lyon in 1975. He received two 48-year sentences for the two counts of first degree felony murder he was facing. The sentences will be served concurrently.

Documentary 
The murder was the subject of the 2020 documentary Who Killed the Lyon Sisters?, written and produced by Inkblot Narratives. The documentary follows journalist Mark Bowden's investigation of the crime.

Who Killed the Lyon Sisters? was awarded Best Documentary in Television and Best Editing in Television by the 42nd Annual Telly Awards and two additional Silver Tellys: one for Cinematography in Television and one for True Crime.

See also

Crime in Maryland
List of murder convictions without a body
List of solved missing person cases
John Brennan Crutchley, a deceased rapist and possible serial killer suspected of links to as many as 20 or so disappearances of teenaged girls and young women in and around the Washington, DC area.
Murder of the Grimes sisters, unsolved 1956 killing of two sisters in Chicago who were out walking on their own
The Last Stone, a book on the interrogation and conviction of Lloyd Welch by Mark Bowden.

References

External links
Websleuths forum on Lyon Sisters (opinion forums but many newspaper articles and links are reprinted partially or in their entirety) 
Montgomery County Gazette Newspaper Article on the 30th Anniversary on impact on the community
Missing person's profile of Sheila Lyon
Missing person's profile of Katherine Lyon
Who Killed the Lyon Sisters?, a documentary originally airing on Investigation Discovery produced by Inkblot Narratives and Wild Eyes Productions

1970s missing person cases
1975 in Maryland
1975 murders in the United States
March 1975 events in the United States
March 1975 crimes
Kidnappings in the United States
Missing person cases in Maryland
People murdered in Maryland
Murder convictions without a body
Wheaton, Maryland
Incidents of violence against girls
Female murder victims